is a volleyball player from Japan.

She competed at the 2004 Summer Olympics in Athens, Greece, wearing the Number 2 jersey. She and the Japan women's national team took fifth place. Tsuji played as a setter.

External links
 FIVB biography

1969 births
Living people
Japanese women's volleyball players
Volleyball players at the 2004 Summer Olympics
Olympic volleyball players of Japan
Asian Games medalists in volleyball
Volleyball players at the 1990 Asian Games
Volleyball players at the 1994 Asian Games
Medalists at the 1990 Asian Games
Medalists at the 1994 Asian Games
Asian Games bronze medalists for Japan
Goodwill Games medalists in volleyball
Competitors at the 1994 Goodwill Games